Delo Group is the biggest Russian private holdings for logistics and freight forwarding. It comprises and manages numerous port assets in the Sea of Azov and Black Sea, Baltic and Far Eastern basins, including a provider of rail and multimodal container transportation, container park and well cars. Delo Group is part of the Delo holding company, 70% of which is owned by its founder Sergey Shishkarev, and the other 30% by “Rosatom” state corporation.

The key companies within the Group are DeloPorts stevedoring holding and Global Ports container terminal operator. Transport logistics are managed by Ruscon multimodal transport agent and intermodal container operator TransContainer.

History 
Delo’s first enterprise, “Delo” shipping company, was founded in 1993 by Russian businessman Sergey Shishkarev, it became the first private operator at the Port of Novorossiysk and a major transportation agent, accounted for more than 50% of freight forwarding services. In the 1990s Delo consolidated 19.78% of the privatized Novorossiysk Commercial Sea Port (NCSP). By 2000s 33% of the NCSP shares were held by Uralsib (former ‘NIKoil’), 16% belonged to Alexander Ponomarenko and Aleksandr Skorobogatko (co-owners of ‘Investsberbank’), and disagreements regarding management and financing started to arise between Delo and the shareholders. At the beginning of 2006 Skorobogatko and Ponomarenko acquired Delo’s block of shares in a business transaction, structured by Alfa-Eco (part of Alfa Group).

In 2007 “Delo” acquired ‘Kombinat “Stroikomplekt” ‘, which neighbored NUTEP, to start construction of a new grain terminal KSK. In 2012 KSK, among other Group’s stevedoring assets, was merged with DeloPorts.

In 2011 Delo consolidated 100% of specialized “NUTEP” container terminal. The terminal was created in 2002 from scratch in south-eastern part of the Port of Novorossiysk. Companies “Sverstaltrans” (now N-Trans) and National Container Company were the Group’s partners at the time.

In 2012—2013 Delo constructed “Novorossiysk Oil Transshipment Complex” at the Port of Novorossiysk, subsequently reselling it to “Gazprom Neft Marine Bunker” with the dock-side terminal Novorosnefteservis.

In 2016 multimodal transport agent “Ruscon” has obtained Russian storage logistics company “SLG-Operating”.

In 2018 Delo acquired 30,75% of Global Ports, which is the leading container terminal operator on the Russian market. Global Ports’ strategic partner is APM Terminals.

In 2019 on the Black Sea a one-of-a-kind deep-sea terminal №38 began operating. It is located in the NUTEP container terminal and can receive container ships up to 10 000 TEUs in capacity.

Later in November, Delo won an auction for acquiring more than 50% of TransContainer shares, the deal was closed later in December. State corporation Rosatom has obtained 30% of Delo’s shares in order to mutually develop the Group's logistics business.

In 2020 Delo has consolidated 99,6% of “TransContainer” shares.

Assets 

Delo Group operates in the Sea of Azov and Black Sea, Baltic and Far Eastern Basins. Its key assets are stevedoring companies DeloPorts and Global Ports, intermodal container operator TransContainer and the multimodal transport operator Ruscon.

DeloPorts holding consolidates the Group’s assets at the Port of Novorossiysk, which are the NUTEP container terminal, KSK and Delo service operator (agency, bunkering and towing services).

From April 2018 Delo Group controls 30.75% of Global Ports, the biggest Russian stevedoring holding, which operates a network of five marine container terminals in Russia and two in Finland, as well as a logistics complex near Saint Petersburg.

The transportation and logistics segment comprises the multimodal transport operator “Ruscon” and the intermodal container operator “TransContainer”, which has the biggest container park in Russia and well cars for 1520mm railways.

Stevedoring 
Delo’s stevedoring includes DeloPorts and Global Ports.
In 2012 the DeloPorts company was registered in the city of Limassol in Cyprus as a holding. 90% of the DeloPorts shares belonged to Russian businessman Sergey Shishkarev, while the rest 10% owned his nephew Timophey Telyatnik. The latter also had a President seat at the executive board. Eventually, the partners split due to the disagreements in business strategies: in 2015 Shishkarev purchased Telyatnik’s shares and transferred the Group to Russian jurisdiction. In April 2018 the firm completed the acquisition of 30.75% Global Ports shares from N-Trans (co-owned by Nikolaev, Mishin and Filatov), financed with Delo Group's own funds, DeloPorts bond issue and credited by Sovkombank.

Currently, the majority shareholders of Global Ports (Delo Group and APM Terminals) own equal blocks of 30.75%, 9% belongs to former NCC subsidiaries and 20.5% are in public float. According to the terms of agreement, DeloPorts and Global Ports are to be managed by separate executive boards.

DeloPorts 

DeloPorts holding includes the NUTEP container terminal, KSK and Delo service operator.

NUTEP is a container terminal, which handles container, general and roll-on/roll-off cargo  transshipment in the Port of Novorossiysk, that can receive container ships up to 10 000 TEUs in capacity. The throughput capacity of the terminal will be increased to 700,000 TEU/year after the investment program is over in 2021.

KSK is the third grain terminal in the Black Sea region of Russia by its size, which began operating in 2006. The complex is located in south-eastern part of the Port of Novorossiysk. Apart from bulk loads, the terminal executes general and roll-on/roll-off cargo transshipments. Estimated capacity is 6,0 million tons a year. DeloPorts owns 75% of the KSK, 25% is owned by Cargill.

Delo Service operator is providing towage and shipping agency services in the port of Novorossiysk.

Global Ports 

Global Ports include First Container Terminal, Petrolesport, Moby Dik in St. Petersburg and Yanino Logistics Park in the vicinity, port cluster, Vostochnaya Stevedoring Company in the Vostochny Port. Finnish Multi-Link Terminals in Helsinki and Kotka also belong to Global Ports. From June 2011 Global Ports’ depositary receipts are being exchanged at London Stock Exchange

Transport logistics 

Transport logistics are managed by “Ruscon” and “TransContainer”.

TransContainer 

“TransContainer” owns and operates 84,000 large capacity containers and 31,000 well cars, possessing their own container terminals at 38 railroad stations in Russia and controls terminals in Kazakhstan and Slovakia.

In November 2019 Delo won an auction for acquiring more than 50% of TransContainer shares, owned by Russian Railways. While the starting price was 36,2 billion roubles, the company offered 60,3 billion roubles. The deal was partially financed by Sberbank of Russia, which performed the creditor’s role, and from the company's budget. In March 2020 the Delo Group consolidated 99,6% of the shares. “Enisey Capital”, owned by Roman Abramovich and Alexander Abramov (25,1%), and VTB Bank (24,5%) took the offer and sold their shares.

Ruscon 

Ruscon — 3PL transportation agent, specializing on containers in Russia and CIS states in the structure of the Delo holding. In April 2019 the company possessed 650 well cars and rented 300; they planned extending up to 5000 well cars by 2022. In October 2017 Ruscon acquired a 6.5 hectares rear container terminal with the direct access to state highway M4 “Don” and the railway station, located 5 km from the Port of Novorossiysk

Corporate Overview

Owners and Management

Delo Group is solely owned by Sergey Shishkarev, who also occupies the President's seat. The executive board also includes Delo and DeloPorts director Igor Yakovenko and Global Ports head Albert Likholet. Sergey Berezkin holds Ruscon’s president position.

Financials

DeloPorts’ total consolidated revenue in 2019 was 9,835 million roubles (-17,5%) and consolidated EBITDA was 6,755 million roubles (-23,1%).

GlobalPorts’ revenue for 2019 has increased by 5,3% and was 361,9 million dollars in total, updated EBITDA was 226,9 million dollars (+4,4% compared to the same period last year).

TransContainer’s revenue in 2019 was 1331,8 million dollars, updated EBITDA was 308,9 million dollars.

Sponsorship and social activity

Delo has reported that they participate in charity programs in Krasnodar Krai, in the Far East, in Moscow] and Saint Petersburg, including supporting children sports organizations and institutions for children with special needs.

The Group financed the monument in honour of the port workers, opened at the Admiral Serebryakov embankment near the Port of Novorossiysk. The opening ceremony was  coincided with the 180th anniversary of the city, the 75th anniversary of Novorossiysk liberation during World War II and the 45th jubilee of receiving the Hero City award.

Since 2015 Delo Group sponsors the Handball Federation of Russia and supports the further development of this sport in Russian regions. The company has also been sponsoring men and women’s CSKA handball teams, as well as women’s “HC Kuban Krasnodar” handball team. In February 2019 Delo Group became the title sponsor of the Women's EHF Champions League. Chief Officer of DeloPorts and Chief Operations Officer of EHF Marketing GmbH signed the partnership agreement for seasons 2019/20 and 2020/21 in Vienna, therefore the tournament was named DELO Women's EHF Champions League and its final became DELO Women's EHF FINAL4. Delo has become the first title sponsor in the history of Women’s Handball League.

References

External links 
 Delo Group official website

Port operating companies